Ellis Ferreira and Patrick Galbraith were the defending champions but only Ferreira competed that year with Rick Leach.

Ferreira and Leach lost in the quarterfinals to David Adams and John-Laffnie de Jager.

Yevgeny Kafelnikov and Daniel Vacek won in the final 7–5, 6–3 against Adams and de Jager.

Seeds

  Ellis Ferreira /  Rick Leach (quarterfinals)
  Jonas Björkman /  Patrick Rafter (first round)
  Piet Norval /  Cyril Suk (first round)
  Donald Johnson /  Francisco Montana (first round)

Draw

External links
 1998 CA-TennisTrophy Doubles draw

Doubles